Gemencheh is a state constituency in Negeri Sembilan, Malaysia, that has been represented in the Negeri Sembilan State Legislative Assembly.

The state constituency was first contested in 1974 and is mandated to return a single Assemblyman to the Negeri Sembilan State Legislative Assembly under the first-past-the-post voting system. , the State Assemblyman for Gemencheh is Mohd Isam Mohd Isa from the Barisan Nasional (BN).

History

Polling districts
According to the gazette issued on 24 March 2018, the Gemencheh constituency has a total of 15 polling districts.

Representation history

Election results
The electoral results for the Gemencheh state constituency in 2008, 2013 and 2018 are as follows.

References

Negeri Sembilan state constituencies